Ciudad Celina (formerly Villa celina) is a suburban town located in Greater Buenos Aires, Argentina.

References

Greater Buenos Aires
Populated places in Buenos Aires Province